Curtis Jerome Brown (December 7, 1954 – July 31, 2015) was an American football running back with the Buffalo Bills and Houston Oilers in the National Football League (NFL). He played college football at the University of Missouri.

Brown died July 30, 2015 from a heart attack; he experienced dementia in his later years believed to stem from his playing days.

References

External links
NFL.com player page

1954 births
2015 deaths
People from St. Charles, Missouri
Players of American football from Missouri
African-American players of American football
American football running backs
Missouri Tigers football players
Buffalo Bills players
Houston Oilers players
20th-century African-American sportspeople
21st-century African-American people